Pristimantis altamazonicus is a species of frog in the family Strabomantidae. As currently defined, it is known from the Amazon rainforest of Colombia, Ecuador, and Peru.

Taxonomy
Following a study by Ortega-Andrade and colleagues published in 2017, Pristimantis brevicrus (Andersson, 1945), thought to be a synonym of Pristimantis altamazonicus, was resurrected. Furthermore, specimens from Brazil and Bolivia traditionally referred to this species were found to represent other, as yet undescribed species.

Description
Adult males measure  and females  in snout–vent length. The snout is moderately short and sub-acuminate. Dorsal skin of dorsum smooth, but has small, scattered tubercles in males. Neither fingers nor toes are webbed but they do have lateral fringes. The dorsum and flanks are brown and have reddish and black stains. There is a clear, W-shaped mark in scapular region. There can also be longitudinal cream stripes and dark blotches.

Habitat and conservation
Pristimantis altamazonicus occur in closed-canopy, primary tropical forests, and occasionally in flooded or secondary forests. While they may be found in leaf-litter during the day, they are more typically perched on, and call from, low vegetation in the forest at night.

References

altamazonicus
Amphibians of Colombia
Amphibians of Ecuador
Amphibians of Peru
Taxa named by Emmett Reid Dunn
Taxa named by Thomas Barbour
Amphibians described in 1921
Taxonomy articles created by Polbot